The Denmark Under-19 cricket team represents the country of Denmark in U-19 international cricket.

Denmark played their first Under-19 fixture against the Netherlands Under-19 in Toronto in 1979.  The team played 6 youth One Day International's during the ICC Under-19 Cricket World Cup.  These were the team's only youth One Day International appearances, as well as their only Under-19 World Cup appearance.

Under-19 World Cup record

Squads

2019 squad

The current U-19 squad representing Denmark (as of July 2019).

Abdullah Mahmood (C), Hadeed Adnan (WK), Aden Aftab, Bilal Aftab, Sami Ahmed, Lucky Ali, Azim Khan, Wahid Mahmood, Moeez Raza, Musa Shaheen, Imal Uriakhail, Sameer Zeb, Sami Zeb, Shekeel Zeb

References

External links
Denmark at Cricinfo

Under-19 cricket teams
Denmark in international cricket